Botsfengselet is a former national prison for long-term prisoners in Oslo, Norway. Its location is at the former Åkebergløkka, Grønlandsleiret 41.

The prison was designed by architect Heinrich Ernst Schirmer. The prison was built starting 1844 and came into use from 1851. The prison chapel was designed by architect Jacob Wilhelm Nordan and came into use during 1887.

In 1970 Ullersmo Prison took over as a prison for long-term prisoners in Norway, while Botsfengselet was rehabilitated and served as a department of the district prison in Oslo from 1975. The prison is listed as a protected site.

See also
Oslo Prison

References

Buildings and structures in Oslo
1851 establishments in Norway
Government buildings completed in 1851
Prisons in Norway
20th century in Oslo
Listed buildings and structures in Norway
19th century in Oslo